Digrammia setonana is a species of geometrid moth in the family Geometridae. It is found in North America.

The MONA or Hodges number for Digrammia setonana is 6364.

References

Further reading

External links

 

Macariini
Articles created by Qbugbot
Moths described in 1927